Sarah Ann McLachlan OC OBC (born January 28, 1968) is a Canadian singer-songwriter. As of 2015, she had sold over 40 million albums worldwide. McLachlan's best-selling album to date is Surfacing, for which she won two Grammy Awards (out of four nominations) and four Juno Awards. In addition to her personal artistic efforts, she founded the Lilith Fair tour, which showcased female musicians.

Early and personal life
McLachlan was born on January 28, 1968, in Halifax, Nova Scotia, Canada. She was placed with the McLachlan family, which later legally adopted her.

As a child, she was a member of Girl Guides of Canada, participating in Guiding programs.

She played music from a very young age, beginning with the ukulele when she was four. She studied classical guitar, classical piano, and voice at the Maritime Conservatory of Music through the curriculum of The Royal Conservatory of Music. At 17, while she was still a student at Queen Elizabeth High School, in Halifax, she fronted a short-lived rock band called The October Game. One of the band's songs, "Grind", credited as a group composition, can be found on the independent Flamingo Records release Out of the Fog and the CD Out of the Fog Too. It has yet to be released elsewhere.

Following The October Game's first concert at Dalhousie University opening for Moev, McLachlan was offered a recording contract with Vancouver-based independent record label Nettwerk by Moev's Mark Jowett. McLachlan's parents insisted that she finish high school and complete one year of studies at the Nova Scotia College of Art and Design before moving to Vancouver and embarking on a new life as a recording artist. She finally signed to Nettwerk two years later before having written a single song. When she was 19, a mutual acquaintance introduced her to her birth mother. McLachlan did not seek her out and was ambivalent about meeting her.

In 1994, McLachlan was sued by Uwe Vandrei, an obsessed fan from Ottawa, who alleged that his letters to her had been the basis of the single "Possession". The lawsuit was also challenging for the Canadian legal system since Vandrei was an admitted stalker whose acknowledged goal in filing the lawsuit was to be near McLachlan. Consequently, precautions were taken to ensure McLachlan's safety if she had to be in the same location as Vandrei. Before the trial began, however, Vandrei was found dead in an apparent suicide. Vandrei's preoccupation with McLachlan was explored at length in Canadian author Judith Fitzgerald's book, Building a Mystery: The Story of Sarah McLachlan & Lilith Fair.

In 1997, McLachlan married her drummer, Ashwin Sood, in Jamaica. While she was pregnant with her first child, her mother died from cancer in December 2001. While working on her next album, Afterglow, she gave birth to daughter India in Vancouver on April 6, 2002. On June 22, 2007, she gave birth to her second daughter, Taja, also in Vancouver. McLachlan announced her separation from Sood in September 2008 and they divorced the same year.

Career and albums

1987–92: Touch and Solace 
The signing with Nettwerk prompted McLachlan to move to Vancouver, British Columbia. There she recorded her first album, Touch, in 1987, which received both critical and commercial success and included the song "Vox". During this period she also contributed to an album by Moev, provided vocals on Manufacture's "As the End Draws Near", and embarked on her first national concert tour as an opening act for The Grapes of Wrath.

Her 1991 album, Solace, was her mainstream breakthrough in Canada, spawning the hit singles "The Path of Thorns (Terms)" and "Into the Fire". Solace also marked the beginning of her partnership with Pierre Marchand. Marchand and McLachlan have been collaborators ever since, with Marchand producing many of McLachlan's albums and occasionally co-writing songs.

1993–2000: Fumbling Towards Ecstasy, Surfacing, and Mirrorball 

1993's Fumbling Towards Ecstasy was an immediate hit in Canada. From her Nettwerk connection, her piano version of the song "Possession" was included on the first Due South soundtrack in 1996. Over the next two years, Fumbling Towards Ecstasy became McLachlan's international breakthrough as well, scaling the charts in a number of countries.

Following the success from Fumbling Towards Ecstasy, McLachlan returned in 1997 with Surfacing, her best-selling album to date. The album earned her two 1998 Grammy Awards, one for Best Female Pop Vocal Performance (for "Building a Mystery") and one for Grammy Award for Best Pop Instrumental Performance (for "Last Dance"), and four Juno Awards, including Album of the Year for Surfacing and Song of the Year and Songwriter of the Year for "Building a Mystery". Reaching number one on the Canadian Albums Chart and number two on the US Billboard 200, the album has since sold over 16 million copies worldwide and brought her much international success. Still in the spotlight from the album, McLachlan launched the highly popular Lilith Fair tour. Her song "Angel"—inspired by the fatal overdose of Smashing Pumpkins touring keyboardist Jonathan Melvoin—made sales skyrocket. One of the songs from Surfacing, "Full of Grace," features in the Season 2 finale of Buffy the Vampire Slayer, "Becoming (Part II)", Dawson's Creek'''s Season 1 episode 4 "Discovery" and the film Moll Flanders (1996 film).

Fellow adoptee Darryl McDaniels was so touched by "Angel" that it inspired him to reassess his life and career. He credits McLachlan and her album Surfacing (on which "Angel" appeared) with saving his life. They have collaborated on many projects in support of the rights of adoptees.

In 1999, McLachlan released a live album, Mirrorball. The album's singles included a new live version of her earlier song, "I Will Remember You", a studio recording of which had previously been released on The Brothers McMullen soundtrack as well as Rarities, B-Sides and Other Stuff. The song was released as a single twice, once in 1995 where it peaked No. 65 on the US Billboard Hot 100 and No. 10 in Canada, and again in 1999 at No. 14 on the US Billboard Hot 100 and No. 10 in Canada. The 1999 version garnered McLachlan her third Grammy Awards for Best Female Pop Vocal Performance (for "I Will Remember You") in 2000.

In 1998, the motion picture City of Angels featured "Angel". The soundtrack reached number one on the Billboard chart. More than five months after the film disappeared from the theatres, the soundtrack remained firmly entrenched among Billboards top 40 albums and earned quadruple-platinum status.

In 1999, McLachlan recorded the Randy Newman song "When She Loved Me" on the Toy Story 2 soundtrack. This song was nominated for the Academy Award for Best Original Song in 2000, and McLachlan performed it at the awards ceremony, but she didn't win.

 2006: Wintersong 
In October 2006, McLachlan released a Christmas album, Wintersong. The album included 11 new recordings, featuring covers of Joni Mitchell's "River", Gordon Lightfoot's "Song for a Winter's Night", and John Lennon's "Happy Xmas (War Is Over)", which she recorded with her outreach children and youth choir, and seasonal favourites: "Christmas Time Is Here", "O Little Town of Bethlehem", "Have Yourself a Merry Little Christmas", "Silent Night", "The First Noel", and "Greensleeves (What Child Is This?)", among others. The title track is an original work of McLachlan's.Wintersong debuted at No. 42 on the Billboard 200 album chart the week ending November 4, 2006. It peaked at No. 7. Worldwide the album has sold over 1.1 million copies to date. It has been certified Platinum in the U.S. and 2× Platinum in Canada, where it became her third consecutive album to reach number one.Wintersong was nominated for both a Grammy Award, in the Best Traditional Pop Vocal Album category, as well as for a Juno Award, for Pop Album of the Year.

On October 3, 2006, the live album Mirrorball was re-released as Mirrorball: The Complete Concert. This release contains two discs that were compiled from two concerts performed on consecutive nights in April 1998 at the Rose Garden arena in Portland, Oregon.

 2014–2015: Shine On 
In late January 2014, McLachlan announced the release of her next studio album, Shine On, which was inspired by the death of her father. It was her first release on Verve Records, after leaving Nettwerk/Arista after over twenty years. The album was released on May 6, 2014.

In March 2014 McLachlan announced a schedule for a Shine On tour across the United States, which began in Seattle on June 20, 2014. The tour visited 30 cities all together. The Canadian leg of the tour was to include 25 shows in 21 cities.

On May 14, 2014, it was announced that Shine On debuted at No. 4 on the US Billboard charts, with 42,000 copies.

In March 2015, McLachlan won a Juno for Adult Contemporary Album of the Year for Shine On.

 2016–present: Wonderland 

On October 21, 2016, McLachlan released Wonderland, her ninth studio album and second Christmas album. Wonderland contains interpretations of 13 traditional and contemporary holiday classics. 
 
McLachlan performed at the Macy's Thanksgiving Day Parade on November 24 as well as NBC's annual Christmas in Rockefeller Center special on November 30. She also performed on ABC's CMA Country Christmas Special on November 28, Live with Kelly! on December 8 and Harry TV on December 16.

McLachlan released the single "The Long Goodbye" in December 2016.

In January 2019, McLachlan was announced as the host of the Juno Awards of 2019.

In a February 2019 interview, McLachlan stated that she was set to debut a new song titled "Wilderness" during her then-current tour.

In 2023, she participated in an all-star recording of Serena Ryder's single "What I Wouldn't Do", which was released as a charity single to benefit Kids Help Phone's Feel Out Loud campaign for youth mental health.

 Lilith Fair 

In 1996, McLachlan became frustrated with concert promoters and radio stations that refused to feature two female musicians in a row. Bucking conventional industry wisdom, she booked a successful tour for herself and Paula Cole. At least one of their appearances together – in McLachlan's home town, on September 14, 1996 – went by the name "Lilith Fair" and included performances by McLachlan, Cole, Lisa Loeb, and Michelle McAdorey, formerly of Crash Vegas.

The next year, McLachlan founded the Lilith Fair tour, taking Lilith from the medieval Jewish legend that Lilith was Adam's first wife.

In 1997, Lilith Fair, featuring McLachlan as one of the headlining acts, garnered a $16 million gross, making it the top-grossing of any touring festival. Among all concert tours for that year, it was the 16th highest grossing. Lilith Fair tour brought together two million people over its three-year history and raised more than $7 million for charities. It was the most successful all-female music festival in history, one of the biggest music festivals of the 1990s, and helped launch the careers of several well-known female artists. Subsequent Lilith Fairs followed in 1998 and 1999 before the tour was discontinued.

Nettwerk CEO and Lilith Fair co-founder Terry McBride announced that the all-female festival would make its return in mid-2010 in Canada, the United States, and Europe. A list of 36 North American shows was released. But poor ticket sales, financial problems, and headliners' withdrawing out of fear of not being paid caused 13 of the shows to be cancelled. The two-week European tour never materialized.

 Additional projects and guest appearances 

In 1997, McLachlan co-wrote and provided guest vocals on the Delerium song "Silence" for their album Karma. This song achieved a massive amount of US top 40 airplay when released as a single in late 2000 and also featured on the soundtrack for the movie Brokedown Palace. It has been hailed as one of the greatest trance songs of all time, over a decade after its initial release. The Tiësto remix of the song was voted by Mixmag readers as the 12th greatest dance record of all time.

In 2001, McLachlan provided background vocals, guitar, and piano on the closing track "Love Is" from Stevie Nicks' eighth solo album, Trouble in Shangri-La, in addition to drawing the dragon used for the "S" in Stevie's name on the album cover. In May 2002, her duet with Bryan Adams was released on the Spirit: Stallion of the Cimarron soundtrack. She sang harmonies and played the piano on the song "Don't Let Go" while Sood did the drum work.

In November 2006, McLachlan performed the song "Ordinary Miracle" for that year's feature film, Charlotte's Web. There were rumors of a potential Oscar nomination for the song, but the song was not nominated. She performed the song on The Oprah Winfrey Show, during the Macy's Thanksgiving Day Parade, and at the opening ceremony of the 2010 Winter Olympics.

In early 2007, she sang on Dave Stewart's Go Green, alongside Nadirah X, Imogen Heap, Natalie Imbruglia, and others.

In 2009, she did backing vocals on Susan Enan's song "Bring on the Wonder" which was featured in the television show Bones.  It was subsequently featured on both Enan's (Plainsong) and McLachlan's (Laws of Illusion) albums.

On September 10, 2011, McLachlan performed I Will Remember You and Angel at a ceremony in Stonycreek, Pennsylvania, commemorating the passengers and crew of hijacked United Airlines Flight 93 who fought the hijackers and brought down their airplane on September 11, 2001. The event marked the dedication of the Flight 93 National Memorial and was attended by former President George W. Bush, former First Lady Laura Bush, former President Bill Clinton, Vice President Joe Biden and Speaker John Boehner.

On June 13, 2019, McLachlan sang "O Canada" before Game 6 of the 2019 NBA Finals.

Awards and achievements

McLachlan has been nominated for 26 Juno Awards and has won twelve. In 1992, her video for "Into the Fire" was selected as best music video. In 1998, she won Female Vocalist of the Year, Songwriter of the Year (along with Pierre Marchand), Single of the Year for "Building a Mystery", and Album of the Year for Surfacing. In 2000, she won an International Achievement award and in 2004, won Pop Album of the Year for Afterglow and again shared the Songwriter of the Year award with Pierre Marchand for the singles "Fallen", "World on Fire", and "Stupid". In 2009 she was presented with the Humanitarian Award and she won the Adult Contemporary Album of the year award in 2015 for "Shine On" and again in 2017 for "Wonderland".

McLachlan has also won three Grammy Awards. She was awarded Best Female Pop Vocal Performance in 1997 for "Building a Mystery" and again in 1999 for the live version of "I Will Remember You". She also scored Best Pop Instrumental Performance in 1997 for "Last Dance".

McLachlan's song "Building a Mystery" came in at 91 on VH1's 100 Greatest Songs of the 90s.

McLachlan was awarded the Elizabeth Cady Stanton Visionary Award in 1998 for advancing the careers of women in music. In 1999, she was appointed as an Officer of the Order of Canada by then-Governor General Adrienne Clarkson in recognition of her successful recording career, her role in Lilith Fair, and the charitable donations she made to women's shelters across Canada. In 2001, she was inducted to the Order of British Columbia.

On June 15, 2011, she was recognized with an honorary degree from Simon Fraser University.

Kiwanis International presented McLachlan with the 2013 Kiwanis International World Service Medal to recognize her for founding the Sarah McLachlan School of Music, a free music school for at-risk youth in Vancouver, British Columbia.

On November 20, 2013, McLachlan was recognized with an Honorary Doctor of Laws degree from the University of Alberta.

In 2012, McLachlan was inducted into Canada's Walk of Fame. In May 2015, she received a Governor General's Performing Arts Award for Lifetime Artistic Achievement, Canada's highest honour in the performing arts.

On April 2, 2017, at the Juno Awards ceremony, McLachlan was inducted into the Canadian Music Hall of Fame.

Philanthropy
Sarah McLachlan School of Music
McLachlan also funds an outreach program in Vancouver that provides music education for inner city children. In 2007, the provincial government announced $500,000 in funding for the outreach program. Originating at the "Sarah McLachlan Music Outreach", this program evolved into the Sarah McLachlan School of Music. This program provided children with high quality music instruction in guitar, piano, percussion and choir.

In 2011 McLachlan opened the Sarah McLachlan School of Music in Vancouver, a free music school for at-risk youth. The School of Music provides group and private lessons to hundreds of young people every year. It is their goal that through music education, students will develop a love of the arts and have greater self-esteem.

On May 25, 2016, the Sarah McLachlan School of Music expanded to Edmonton, Alberta, opening in Rundle Elementary School and Eastglen High School. The music school contains the same initiative as the Vancouver school.

ASPCA
McLachlan supported the ASPCA by appearing in advertisements. She filmed a two-minute advertisement for the organization which featured her song "Angel". The advertisement's imagery of shelter animals mixed with the soundtrack and McLachlan's simple appeal for donations has raised $30 million for the ASPCA since it began to air in 2006, which allowed the organization to air appeals in higher profile prime-time cable ad slots; subsequently the organization produced a new ad for the 2008 holiday season featuring McLachlan appealing for the ASPCA over her Wintersong performance of "Silent Night", and a new ad with her was released in January 2009 featuring the song "Answer". In 2012, McLachlan wrote a letter on behalf of PETA to then-Canadian Prime Minister Stephen Harper, protesting that country's annual seal hunt. During Super Bowl XLVIII on February 3, 2014, McLachlan parodied her ASPCA appeals in an Audi commercial featuring a "Doberhuahua" dog gnawing on the neck of her guitar. She would also done another parody of these appeals on Super Bowl LVII on February 12, 2023, this time for a commercial for Busch Light.

 Other charitable contributions 

McLachlan contributed the track "Hold On" to the 1993 AIDS-benefit album No Alternative, produced by the Red Hot Organization. She also performed at the Leonard Peltier Defense Fund Benefit Concert on February 12, 1997, and went on to release a cover version of Unchained Melody created as part of her support for Peltier. It was later included on the album Rarities, B-Sides and Other Stuff Volume 2.

In early 2005, McLachlan took part in a star-studded tsunami disaster relief telethon on NBC. On January 29 McLachlan was a headliner for a benefit concert in Vancouver along with other Canadian superstars such as Avril Lavigne and Bryan Adams. The show also featured a performance by the Sarah McLachlan Musical Outreach Choir & Percussion Ensemble, a children's choir and percussion band from the aforementioned Vancouver outreach program. Entitled One World: The Concert for Tsunami Relief, the concert raised approximately $3.6 million for several Canadian aid agencies working in south and southeast Asia.

On July 2, 2005, McLachlan participated in the Philadelphia installment of the Live 8 concerts, where she performed her hit "Angel" with Josh Groban. These concerts, which were held simultaneously in nine major cities around the world, were intended to coincide with the G8 summit to put pressure on the leaders of the world's richest nations to fight poverty in Africa by cancelling debt.

In 2008, she donated a song to Aid Still Required's CD to assist with the restoration of the devastation done to Southeast Asia from the 2004 tsunami.

On November 30, 2012, McLachlan lent her support to Kate Winslet's Golden Hat Foundation together with Tim Janis, Loreena McKennitt, Andrea Corr, Hayley Westenra, Sleepy Man Banjo Boys, Dawn Kenney, Jana Mashonee, Amy Petty and a choir etc. performing on "The American Christmas Carol" concert in Carnegie Hall.

McLachlan is a member of the Canadian charity Artists Against Racism.

Discography

Studio albums
 Touch (1988)
 Solace (1991)
 Fumbling Towards Ecstasy (1993)
 Surfacing (1997)
 Afterglow (2003)
 Wintersong (2006)
 Laws of Illusion (2010)
 Shine On (2014)
 Wonderland (2016)

References

External links

 
 
 Sarah McLachlan Video produced by Makers: Women Who Make America''

 
1968 births
Living people
20th-century Canadian keyboardists
20th-century Canadian guitarists
20th-century Canadian multi-instrumentalists
20th-century Canadian women singers
21st-century Canadian keyboardists
21st-century Canadian guitarists
21st-century Canadian multi-instrumentalists
21st-century Canadian women singers
Arista Records artists
Ballad musicians
Canadian adoptees
Canadian agnostics
Canadian banjoists
Canadian feminist writers
Canadian feminists
Canadian harpists
Canadian mezzo-sopranos
Canadian multi-instrumentalists
Canadian music video directors
Canadian philanthropists
Canadian pop guitarists
Canadian pop pianists
Canadian Screen Award winners
Canadian ukulele players
Canadian women guitarists
Canadian women pianists
Canadian women pop singers
Canadian women singer-songwriters
Female music video directors
Feminist musicians
Governor General's Performing Arts Award winners
Grammy Award winners
Juno Award for Adult Contemporary Album of the Year winners
Juno Award for Album of the Year winners
Juno Award for Artist of the Year winners
Juno Award for Pop Album of the Year winners
Juno Award for Single of the Year winners
Juno Award for Songwriter of the Year winners
Juno International Achievement Award winners
Members of the Order of British Columbia
Music festival founders
Musicians from Halifax, Nova Scotia
Musicians from Vancouver
Nettwerk Records artists
NSCAD University alumni
Officers of the Order of Canada
RCA Records artists
The Royal Conservatory of Music alumni
Women harpists
Women keyboardists
Writers from Halifax, Nova Scotia
Writers from Vancouver
20th-century women guitarists
21st-century women guitarists
20th-century women pianists
21st-century women pianists
Canadian Music Hall of Fame inductees